Ponnukku Thanga Manasu is a 2018 Tamil-language soap opera, which was aired on Vijay TV from 20 August 2018 to 12 December 2020 for 559 episodes. This serial is available on Disney+ Hotstar.

It is a remake of the Malayalam serial Sthreedhanam that aired on Asianet.
It stars Vindhuja Vikraman, Ashwin, Chitra Shenoy, Tejaswini Shekhar, Jennifer Antony and K. S. G. Venkatesh.

Crossover and special episodes
It had a crossover with the serial Sundari Neeyum Sundaram Naanum from 27 November 2019 to 2 December 2019. They were one-hour episodes still the week. The episodes were based on the marriage of Velu and Thamilzharasi. (Episodes 354-357). It was directed by Harrison.

Synopsis
Prashanth's wedding kicks off the show. He is the eldest of the three sons of Sethulakshmi and Lakshmanan Pillai. They come from a well-to-do family.
Prashanth was caught in the middle Divya from the Sekaran family by Sethulakshmi, a dominating and greedy mother. Sethulakshmi, on either hand, was not delighted that Divya would be welcomed into their household with a worthless grant and a small amount of wealth. She only wants Divya's money. She made issues for Divya and her parents by abusing her position as Divya's mother-in-law. Mayuri, Prashanthan's cousin, inquired about the family's situation.
She planned to destabilize Prashanthan and Divya's marriage to marry Prashanthan. Meanwhile, Sethulakshmi found out that Divya's jewelry are all fake, so she brings Divya back to their house. And later finds out that it is a settlement between Prashanthan and Govindhan, Divya's father.
At last, Sethulakshmi realises her mistake and feels sorry for Divya and Prashanth for treating her in a bad way where she is arrested and Prashanth and Divya live happily after years of torture of Sethulakshmi. Whereas Veni was thrown out due to nonsense which she played in the house.

Cast

Main
 Radhika Rao as Divya Prashanth (Episode 1-100) 
 Vindhuja Vikraman replaced Rao (Episode 101-559) (Prashanth's wife)
She is the main protagonist of this serial. She is a person who loves Prashanth and she fights and is treated badly by Sethulakshmi because of less dowry.
 Ashwin as Prashanth Lakshmanan (Divya's husband)
He is Sethulakshmi son who marries Divya Prashant. He loves Divya and treats her well. 
 Srisha Sougandh as Sethulakshmi Lakshmanan (Episode 1-71)
(Chitra Shenoy replaced Sougandh  (Episode 73-559)
commonly called as  Sethu (Lakshmanan 1st wife, Prashanth,
She is greedy in this serial. She is the main antagonist in this story. She wants people to marry rich people and takes dowry and gold. She wants to destroy the relationship of Prashant and Divya so that he can marry Mayuri; Vasanth, Karthik and Shubha's mother

Supporting
 Tejaswini Shekar (Episode 1-446) / **Swathi Thara (Episode 448-559) as Veni Vasanth (Vasanth's wife)
 Yuvarani (Episode 1-210) / Jennifer Antony (Episode 211-559)as Shanthi Sukumaran (Veni's mother)
 K. S. G. Venkatesh as Ramanathan (Divya and Vidhya's father)
 Rajani Murali as Manjula Ramanathan (Divya and Vidhya's mother)
 Vinuja Vijay 
 Sri Swetha Mahalakshmi as Vidya (Divya's younger sister)
 Kalyan Khanna as Mahesh (Vidya's fiancé)
 Vishwam/ Kumaresan/ KPAC Saji as Lakshmanan (Prashanth, Vasanth, Karthik, Shubha and Karthika's father)
 Devi Chandana as Saradha Lakshmanan (Lakshmanan's second wife)
 Alice Christy as Karthika (Lakshmanan's daughter)
 Vikash Sampath as Karthik Lakshmanan (Sethu's third son)
 Nisha Hedge as Varshini (Karthik's wife)
 Niyaz Khan as Vasanth Lakshmanan (Sethu's second son)
 Suju Vasan (Episode 1-244) / Vaishnavi Arulmozhi (Episode 245-559) as Shubha (Sethu's daughter)
 Mahalakshmi  as Mayoori
 Bindu Aneesh as Nalini (Mayoori's mother)
 Kottayam Rasheed as Sukumaran (Veni's father)
 VJ Krrish as Manmadhan (Madhan)
 Ayyappan as Dr. Kavi
 Dharini as Kavi's mother
 L. Raja / —— as Varshini's father
 Bhagya / Lakshmi as Varshini's mother

Adaptations

References

External links

Star Vijay original programming
Tamil-language television series based on Malayalam-language television series
Tamil-language romance television series
2018 Tamil-language television series debuts
Tamil-language television shows
2020 Tamil-language television series endings